Heinrich Keimig (12 June 1913, Leiselheim, Worms, Germany - 15 January 1966, Offenbach am Main) was a German field handball player who competed in the 1936 Summer Olympics.

He was part of the German field handball team, which won the gold medal. He played one match as goalkeeper.

External links
profile

1913 births
1966 deaths
German male handball players
Olympic handball players of Germany
Field handball players at the 1936 Summer Olympics
Olympic gold medalists for Germany
Olympic medalists in handball
Medalists at the 1936 Summer Olympics
German military personnel of World War II
People from Worms, Germany
Sportspeople from Rhineland-Palatinate